was the 12th daimyō of Asada Domain in Settsu Province, Japan. Aoki clan

Kazuoki was the sixth son of Aoki Kazusada, the 10th daimyō. In 1847 he succeeded his elder brother Shigetatsu, who abdicated. Kazuoki died on 26 September 1849 at age 28, having been daimyō for only two years.

References 

1822 births
1849 deaths
Daimyo
Aoki clan